James Bradford may refer to:

 James Bradford (weightlifter) (1928–2013), American weightlifter and Olympic medalist
 James C. Bradford (born 1945), American professor of history at Texas A&M University
 Jim Bradford (politician) (1933–2020), politician in South Dakota
 Jim Bradford (footballer) (1926–2005), Australian rules football player
 James W. Bradford (born c. 1948), American businessman and academic
 James Cowdon Bradford Sr. (1892–1981), American businessman

See also 
 Bradford (name)